is a district located in Nagano Prefecture, Japan.

As of 1 December 2005, the district has an estimated population of 29,263. As of December 2005, the district have two towns and four villages.
Kawakami
Kitaaiki
Koumi
Minamiaiki
Minamimaki
Sakuho

District Timeline (post World War II)
April 1, 1954 - The municipalities of Nozawa, Sakurai, Kishino, Maeyama, and Osawa merged to form the town of Nozawa.
February 1, 1955 - The villages of Sakae and Umise merged to form the town of Saku.
August 1, 1955 - The town of Usuda merged with the village of Kirihara to form the town of Usuda.
August 1, 1956 - The municipalities of Nakagomi, Hiraga, and Uchimura merged to form the town of Nakagoshi.
September 30, 1956
The village of Ohyuga merged into the town of Saku.
The villages of Taguchi and Aonuma merged to form the village of Taguchiaonuma.
The town of Koumi merged with the village of Hokuboku to form the town of Koumi.
April 1, 1957 - The village of Taguchiaonuma merged with the town of Usuda to form the town of Usuda.
March 25, 1958 - Parts of the town of Koumi merged into the village of Yachiho.
April 1, 1959 - Parts of the town of Usuda merged into the town of Saku.
April 1, 1961 - The towns of Nozawa and Nakagomi merged with the municipalities of Asama and Azuma from Kitasaku District to form the city of Saku.
March 20, 2005 - The town of Saku and the village of Yachiho merged to form the new town of Sakuho.
April 1, 2005 - The town of Usuda merged with the town of Mochizuki, the village of Asashina, from Kitasaku District, and the old city of Saku to form the new city of Saku.

Districts in Nagano Prefecture